Martyn Layzell (born 1975) is Vicar at St Mark's, Battersea Rise, an Anglican church in London. He is also a worship leader and has regularly led worship at major Christian events including Soul Survivor and New Wine. He features on several live albums from those events both as a singer and a songwriter. He has produced three studio albums, Reward; in collaboration with Tim Hughes, and Lost in Wonder and Turn my Face, with Lost in Wonder winning Christian Booksellers Convention Worship Album of the Year 2004.

Background

Martyn grew up in St Andrew's Chorleywood where Mike Pilavachi was his youth leader. After a psychology degree at Birmingham University, he moved to Soul Survivor Watford, where he latterly worked as Worship Pastor. Martyn and his family moved to St Aldate's Church in Oxford after six years at Soul Survivor, to take up the position of Worship Director under Revd Charlie and Anita Cleverly. He then did a two-year Diploma in Ministry at Wycliffe Hall between 2008 and 2010. He was ordained as curate by the Bishop of London at Holy Trinity Brompton (HTB) in September 2010 and became Associate Vicar from 2015 to 2020.

Discography

Lost in Wonder (EMI CMG, 2003)
 With all my heart
 Sovereign Lord
 Lost in wonder
 Praise You
 Jesus Christ Emmanuel
 You opened up my eyes
 King Jesus I believe
 Devoted
 I'll never stop loving You
 All of me
 I surrender all

Turn my Face (Survivor Records, 2006)

 Join the Song
 For Your glory
 Turn my face
 Through Your precious blood
 I stand in awe
 Immortal, Invisible
 Holding On
 If I should ever falter
 More than anything
 As Jesus walked

See also

 Nicky Gumbel
 Tim Hughes
 Nicky Lee
 Matt Redman

References

1975 births
21st-century Church of England clergy
21st-century English Anglican priests
Alumni of the University of Birmingham
Alumni of Wycliffe Hall, Oxford
British performers of Christian music
Christian music songwriters
English Charismatics
Holy Trinity Brompton people
Living people
People from Oxford